Delias harpalyce, the imperial white, is a butterfly in the family Pieridae. It is endemic to Australia.

Description
The upper surfaces of the forewings and hindwings are a whitish with black margins and a row of whitish small spots on the apex of the forewings. In the females the black outer edges of the wings are wider than in males. The undersides of the wings are chequered whitish and black, with a yellow band on the apex of the forewings and a red band on the middle of the hindwings.

The larvae are about 4 cm in length, with a black body covered by white hairs. These gregarious caterpillars spin a silken web on their host plants (Amyema, Muellerina and Dendrophthoe species).

Distribution and habitat
This species can be found in Australia (New South Wales, Victoria, and South Australia). It lives in the eucalypt forests.

References

External links
 Catalogue of Life

harpalyce
Butterflies described in 1805